This was the 1996–97 Balkan League season, the third and final season of the multi-national ice hockey league. Four teams participated in the league, and Sportul Studentesc Bucharest won the championship.

Regular season

External links
Season on hockeyarchives.info

2
Balkan League (ice hockey) seasons